The 2014 Asian Trampoline Gymnastics Championships was held in Chiba, Japan, June 2–4, 2014. It was the third edition of the Junior Asian Trampoline Gymnastics Championships, but the first one to also feature a senior competition.

Participating nations

Medal winners

References 

Asian Gymnastics Championships
International gymnastics competitions hosted by Japan
Asian Trampoline Gymnastics Championships
Asian Trampoline Gymnastics Championships
Asian Trampoline Gymnastics Championships